Pavitra Bandham is a 1971 Indian Telugu-language drama film, produced by T. Govindarajan and directed by V. Madhusudhana Rao. It stars Akkineni Nageswara Rao, Kanchana, Vanisri and Krishnam Raju, with music composed by S. Rajeswara Rao.

Plot 
Ashok, an unemployed youth, lives in a bus left as scrap. Aruna is the daughter of Chilakalapudi Zamindar, who is placed under several restrictions. Moreover, she is hindered by her cousin Shekar, who aspires to marry her. Annoyed, Aruna leaves the house and moves into Ashok's bus, introducing herself as an orphan, when they fall in love. Later on, Ashok learns Aruna's true identity and takes her back, when she accuses him of betrayal. On his way back, distressed Ashok meets with an accident in which he loses his memory. Meanwhile, Zamindar passes away, accrediting ownership to Aruna, and entrusts her responsibility to his trustworthy servant Subbaiah. Knowing it, Sekhar becomes furious but maintains his cool and sticks around Aruna for the property. Meanwhile, in a village, a charming girl Rani lives along with her mother Durgamma. Once she spots wandering Ashok who is unable to recognize himself, so, she shelters him. Rani provides him a new identity as Raja and tattoos the name on his chest. Both of them like each other and couple up. Soon, they are blessed with a son. Besides, Aruna is still awaiting Ashok. At present, Raja lands in the city to obtain a bank loan for the development of his farms, when he is backstabbed by some burglars. Seriously injured Raja / Ashok is rescued by Aruna when he regains his past but forgets Rani. In the village, perturbed Rani goes in search of Raja when she is shielded by Aruna. Thereupon, Rani gets startled to see Raja as Aruna's fiancé. To clarify her doubt one night, Rani reaches Ashok's bedroom to check the tattoo and confirms him as Raja. Unfortunately, Shekar witnesses it and spoils Aruna's mind too. In that perplexity, Ashok gets a mental shock and collapses. Angered, Aruna orders Subbaiah to throw out Rani. During that time, Durgamma arrives when Subbaiah recognizes her as the original mother of Aruna, who has given her daughter for adoption to childless Zamindar. Here, Shekar & Aruna start denouncing Rani, which makes Subbaiah reveal the truth when malicious Shekar tries to marry Aruna forcibly. At the same time, Ashok retrieves his complete memory and obstructs Shekar. In that quarrel, Aruna is injured while guarding Ashok against harm. Finally, the movie ends with Aruna happily leaving her last breath by uniting Ashok & Rani.

Cast 
Akkineni Nageswara Rao as Ashok / Raja
Kanchana as Aruna
Vanisri as Rani
Krishnam Raju as Shekar
V. Nagayya as Doragaru
Padmanabham as Dasu
Balakrishna as Kaasulu
Raavi Kondala Rao
Dr. Sivaramakrishnaiah
Perumallu as Subbaiah
G. Varalakshmi as Durgamma
Geetanjali as Kanakam
Jhansi as Lakshmi

Soundtrack 
The soundtrack was composed by S. Rajeswara Rao.

References

External links 
 

1970s Telugu-language films
1971 drama films
1971 films
Films directed by V. Madhusudhana Rao
Indian drama films